The Trubezh is a river in Yaroslavl Oblast, Russia. It flows to the Lake Pleshcheyevo. Major city: Pereslavl-Zalessky.

References 

Pereslavl-Zalessky
Rivers of Yaroslavl Oblast